Francis Vercamer (born May 10, 1958, in Lille, Nord) is a French politician of the Union of Democrats and Independents (as part of the Centrists) who served as a member of the National Assembly from 2002 until 2020, representing the Nord department, He is also the mayor of Hem, Nord.

Political career
During his time in parliament, Vercamer served on the Committee on Cultural Affairs (2002-2010), the Committee on Social Affairs (2010-2020), and the Committee on European Affairs (2009-2012).

References

1958 births
Living people
Politicians from Lille
Union for French Democracy politicians
The Centrists politicians
Mayors of places in Hauts-de-France
Deputies of the 12th National Assembly of the French Fifth Republic
Deputies of the 13th National Assembly of the French Fifth Republic
Deputies of the 14th National Assembly of the French Fifth Republic
Deputies of the 15th National Assembly of the French Fifth Republic
Union of Democrats and Independents politicians